Miss Colombia 2013 was the 61st edition of the Miss Colombia pageant. It was held on November 11, 2013 in Cartagena, Colombia. 

At the end of the event, Lucia Aldana of Valle crowned Paulina Vega of Atlántico as Miss Colombia 2013-2014. She represented Colombia in Miss Universe 2014 and was crowned the winner.

Results 

 Color keys

  The contestant won in an International pageant.
  The contestant was a Finalist/Runner-up in an International pageant.
  The contestant did not place.

Scores 

  Miss Colombia 2013-2014
  1st Runner-up
  2nd Runner-up
  3rd Runner-up
  4th Runner-up
  Top 10

Special Awards

Delegates 
21 delegates have been selected to compete.

Contestants Notes 

 Maria Alejandra Lopez was crowned Reina Hispanoamericana 2013 which was held in Santa Cruz, Bolivia on December 12, 2013. In 2014, she also won Miss Caraïbes Hibiscus 2014, which was held in Saint Martin on December 6, 2014.

References

External links
Official site

Miss Colombia
2013 in Colombia
2013 beauty pageants